Sydney Jane Brodt (born May 3, 1998) is an American ice hockey player and member of the U.S. national ice hockey team, currently signed with the Minnesota Whitecaps in the Premier Hockey Federation (PHF).

Playing career 
Brodt attended Mounds View High School, where she was named a Ms. Hockey Minnesota finalist in 2016.

NCAA 
Across four years with the Minnesota Duluth Bulldogs women's ice hockey program, Brodt scored 98 points in 141 games. She was the second player in Bulldogs' history to serve as captain for three seasons. After graduating, she joined the Professional Women's Hockey Players Association (PWHPA) for the 2020–21 season.

International 
She represented the United States at the 2016 IIHF World Women's U18 Championship, winning gold. She would make her senior team debut at the 2018 4 Nations Cup and would play for the U.S. at the 2019 IIHF Women's World Championship.

PWHPA 
Skating for Team Minnesota during the 2020–21 PWHPA season, Brodt participated in a PWHPA Dream Gap Tour event at New York's Madison Square Garden on February 28, 2021, the first women's ice hockey event at the venue. Playing for a team sponsored by Adidas, she was called for a penalty in the third period.

Personal life 

Brodt has a degree in finance from the University of Minnesota Duluth.

References

External links

1998 births
Living people
American women's ice hockey forwards
Ice hockey players from Minnesota
Linköping HC Dam players
Minnesota Duluth Bulldogs women's ice hockey players
Professional Women's Hockey Players Association players
Premier Hockey Federation players
Minnesota Whitecaps players